Vasili Alekseevich Pervukhin (born January 1, 1956) is a Russian former ice hockey player, who competed for the Soviet Union. At the national level he played for Dizelist Penza between 1974 and 1976, and for HC Dynamo Moscow between 1976 and 1989.

At the Olympics, Pervuhkin earned a Silver Medal in 1980 and a Gold in 1984.

Career statistics

Regular season and playoffs

International

External links

 Ice Hockey in Russia - Legends

1956 births
Living people
Dynamo sports society athletes
HC Dynamo Moscow players
Severstal Cherepovets players
Ice hockey players at the 1980 Winter Olympics
Ice hockey players at the 1984 Winter Olympics
Krylya Sovetov Moscow players
Molot-Prikamye Perm players
Olympic gold medalists for the Soviet Union
Olympic ice hockey players of the Soviet Union
Olympic silver medalists for the Soviet Union
Sportspeople from Penza
Russian ice hockey coaches
Russian ice hockey defencemen
Soviet ice hockey defencemen
Olympic medalists in ice hockey
Medalists at the 1984 Winter Olympics
Medalists at the 1980 Winter Olympics
Honoured Masters of Sport of the USSR
Recipients of the Order of Friendship of Peoples